Gornje Selo,, the "Upper village" is a village and a cadastral in Croatia on the island of Šolta in the Split-Dalmatia County. It is connected by the D111 highway. Gornje Selo village in the interior of the island largely without tourism. The population engaged in farming, or are fishermen or seamen. At the beginning of the town there is a modern olive oil mill. To place unspoiled bays are on the south coast and east coast of the island.

During the time of the Austro-Hungarian Empire the villages of Šolta still have their Italian names as well as Villa Superior.

Image gallery

External links

References

Populated places in Split-Dalmatia County
Šolta